Roll Back is an album by Irish rock band Horslips, their first since Short Stories/Tall Tales 25 years earlier.  It is a collection of acoustic re-workings of various songs from the band's catalogue.

Background
In March 2004, three Horslips enthusiasts, Jim Nelis, Stephen Ferris and Paul Callaghan, put on an exhibition of Horslips memorabilia in The Orchard Gallery in Derry.  To open the exhibition, the Nelis, Ferris and Callaghan invited the five original members of the band to perform.  The performance took place on March 20, to an audience of around 200 specially invited guests, where the band played a short set of acoustic versions of some of their better known songs.

Following the enthusiastic reception to the exhibition reunion, the band decided to reconvene again to record a couple of acoustic songs for the forthcoming documentary DVD Return of the Dancehall Sweethearts.  These sessions eventually resulted in a full album of material, consisting of re-recorded versions of songs spanning the band's whole career, some of which were dramatically re-imagined.

Track listing

Personnel 
Horslips
 Eamon Carr - drums, percussions
 Barry Devlin - bass guitar, vocals
 Johnny Fean - guitar, tenor guitar, slide guitar, tenor banjo, vocals
 Jim Lockhart - piano, keyboards, low whistle, vocals
 Charles O'Connor - guitar, tenor guitar, violin, mandolin, concertina, vocals
Guest musician
 Aisling Drury - cello on "Cuchulainn's Lament" and "Furniture"
Production
 Stefano Soffia, Ivan O'Shea - engineering
 Stefano Soffia - mixing
 Peter Mew - mastering
 Charles O'Connor, Chris Ellis - cover art

References 

2004 albums
Horslips albums